Off White Lies is a 2011 Israeli film directed by Maya Kenig in her feature film debut.  It premiered at the 62nd Berlin International Film Festival and received seven nominations for Israel's Ophir Awards, including Best Film, Best Director and Best Screenplay.  Gur Bentwich won a Best Actor award at the Jerusalem Film Festival.

Plot

After years of living in the U.S. with her mother, 13-year-old Libby (Elya Inbar) is sent to Israel to live with her estranged father, Shaul (Gur Bentwich), a hapless inventor who is currently “in-between apartments” (i.e. homeless).  Libby's arrival coincides with the outbreak of the 2006 Lebanon War and, in order to provide a home for her, Shaul pretends that they are refugees from Northern Israel so that a wealthy Jerusalem family, who want to extend a helping hand to their fellow citizens, can take them in.  Finally in a “normal” household, Shaul and Libby begin to build their father-daughter relationship, but their false identities can't last forever, especially as Libby unleashes teenage fury at the lies permeating her life, those she must tell now, and those she's been fed since childhood.

Cast
 Elya Inbar as Libby
 Gur Bentwich as Shaul
 Tzahi Grad as Gideon
 Arad Yeini as Yuval
 Salit Achi-Miriam as Helit

References

External links
 Official website
 

2010s Hebrew-language films
Israeli drama films
2011 films
2011 drama films